United Food and Commercial Workers, Local 1518 v KMart Canada Ltd, [1999] 2 S.C.R. 1083 is a leading Supreme Court of Canada decision on freedom of expression under section 2(b) of the Canadian Charter of Rights and Freedoms. The Court struck down a provision in the Labour Relations Code of British Columbia, which prohibited strikers from distributing fliers outside of their primary picketing area.

The Court held that the provision, which was part of a prohibition on secondary picketing, clearly violated the freedom of expression. The violation could not be saved as the purpose of the prohibition, which was to limit the disruption of those who were not involved in the dispute, was not proportional to the prohibition. Handing out leaflets is a traditional means for under-funded groups to get their message to the public and without it they would have no reasonable alternatives.

See also
 List of Supreme Court of Canada cases (Lamer Court)

External links
 
 case summary from mapleleafweb.com

Canadian freedom of expression case law
Canadian Charter of Rights and Freedoms case law
Supreme Court of Canada cases
Labour relations in Canada
1999 in Canadian case law
Supreme Court of Canada case articles without infoboxes
United Food and Commercial Workers
Sears Holdings
Kmart
Labour relations in British Columbia